Vendeur is a 2016 French dramedy film directed by Sylvain Desclous and co-written by Desclous in collaboration with Olivier Lorelle, Salvatore Lista and Agnès Feuvre. It stars Gilbert Melki and Pio Marmaï.

Cast 
 Gilbert Melki as Serge
 Pio Marmaï as Gérald
 Pascal Elso as Daniel 
 Clémentine Poidatz as Karole
 Sara Giraudeau as Chloé 
 Damien Bonnard as Lilian
 Christian Hecq as Georges
 Serge Livrozet as Serge's father
 Bernard Blancan as The doctor
 Norbert Ferrer as Dove

References

External links 
 

2016 films
2016 comedy-drama films
2010s French-language films
French comedy-drama films
2016 directorial debut films
2016 comedy films
2010s French films